"It Goes Like This" is a song recorded by American country music singer Thomas Rhett. It was released in May 2013 as the third single from his debut album, It Goes Like This. The song was written by Rhett Akins (Thomas' father), Ben Hayslip, and Jimmy Robbins.

Critical reception
Billy Dukes of Taste of Country gave the song three and a half stars out of five, writing that "the charismatic songwriter is a natural storyteller, and his lyrics bounce to life with each verse and chorus." Giving it 4 out of 5 stars, Bobby Peacock of Roughstock described the song's premise as "interesting" and said that "Rhett's lightly grained, casual, friendly delivery brings to mind the rough-edged charm of Kip Moore."

Music video
The music video was directed by TK McKamy and premiered in June 2013.

Chart and sales performance
"It Goes Like This" debuted at number 43 on the U.S. Billboard Country Airplay chart for the week of May 11, 2013. It also debuted at number 28 on the U.S. Billboard Hot Country Songs chart for the week of June 1, 2013. It also debuted at number 96 on the U.S. Billboard Hot 100 chart for the week of June 29, 2013. It also debuted at number 92 on the Canadian Hot 100 chart for the week of July 27, 2013. The song has sold 1,287,000 copies in the United States as of April 2014.

Charts and certifications

Weekly charts

Year-end charts

Certifications

References

2013 singles
Thomas Rhett songs
Big Machine Records singles
Songs written by Rhett Akins
Songs written by Ben Hayslip
Songs written by Jimmy Robbins
Song recordings produced by Michael Knox (record producer)
Music videos directed by TK McKamy
2013 songs